Thom Noble is a British film editor who won an Academy Award and an ACE Eddie Award for the film Witness (1985). He was nominated for the Academy Award and the BAFTA Award for Best Editing for the film Thelma & Louise (1991).

In 2018, he was on jury for the Mumbai International Film Festival.

Selected filmography
Film directors indicated in parenthesis.

 Lancelot and Guinevere (Wilde – 1963; first assistant editor - uncredited)
 Girl in the Headlines (Truman – 1963; first assistant editor - uncredited)
 The Third Secret (Crichton – 1964; assistant editor - uncredited)
 Rattle of a Simple Man (Box – 1964; assistant editor - uncredited)
 The Amorous Adventures of Moll Flanders (Young – 1965; assistant editor)
 Arabesque (Donen – 1966; assistant editor - uncredited)
 Fahrenheit 451 (Truffaut – 1966)
 The Violent Enemy (Sharp – 1967)
 The Man Outside (Gallu – 1967)
 Amsterdam Affair (O'Hara – 1968; second unit director)
 The Man Who Had Power Over Women (Krish – 1970)
 Wake in Fright (Kotcheff – 1971; post-production coordinator)
 And Now for Something Completely Different (MacNaughton – 1971)
 The Strange Vengeance of Rosalie (Starrett – 1972)
 Redneck (Narizzano – 1973)
 Billy Two Hats (Kotcheff – 1974)
 The Apprenticeship of Duddy Kravitz (Kotcheff – 1974)
 Rosebud (Preminger – 1975)
 Inside Out (Duffell – 1975)
 It Shouldn't Happen to a Vet (Till – 1976)
 Joseph Andrews (Richardson – 1977)
 Black Joy (Simmons – 1977)
 The Mighty Peking Man (Meng Hua – 1977)
 Who Is Killing the Great Chefs of Europe? (Kotcheff – 1978)
 North Dallas Forty (Kotcheff – 1979; editorial consultant)
 Boardwalk (Verona – 1979)
 Improper Channels (Till – 1981)
 Tattoo (Brooks – 1981)
 Split Image (Kotcheff – 1982; visual consultant)
 First Blood (Kotcheff – 1982; visual consultant)
 Uncommon Valor (Kotcheff – 1983; editorial consultant)
 Red Dawn (Milius – 1984)
 Witness (Weir – 1985)
 Poltergeist II: The Other Side (Gibson – 1986)
 The Mosquito Coast (Weir – 1986)
 Switching Channels (Kotcheff – 1988)
 Winter People (Kotcheff – 1989)
 Mountains of the Moon (Rafelson – 1990)
 The Exorcist III (Blatty – 1990; uncredited)
 Thelma & Louise (Scott – 1991)
 Final Analysis (Joanou – 1992)
 Body of Evidence (Edel – 1992)
 The Hudsucker Proxy (Coen – 1994)
 Color of Night (Rush – 1994; uncredited)
 Trial by Jury (Gould – 1994; uncredited)
 English, August (Benegal – 1994; uncredited)
 The Scarlet Letter (Joffé – 1995)
 The Island of Dr. Moreau (Frankenheimer – 1996; uncredited)
 Feeling Minnesota (Baigelman – 1996; uncredited)
 The Mask of Zorro (Campbell – 1998)
 Inspector Gadget (Kellogg – 1999)
 Vertical Limit (Campbell – 2000)
 Reign of Fire (Bowman – 2002)
 Soldier of God (Hogan – 2005; consulting editor)
 Flightplan (Schwentke – 2005)
 The Last Time (Caleo – 2006)
 Passengers (Garcia – 2008)
 The Time Traveler's Wife (Schwentke – 2009)
 Red (Schwentke – 2010)
 Alex Cross (Cohen – 2012)
 Point Break (Core – 2015)
 A Family Man (Williams – 2016)
 The Exorcist III: Legion (Blatty – 2016; director's cut)
 Rajma Chawal (Yadav – 2018)
 The Wake of Light (Philip – 2019; editor consultant)
 Guilty (Narain - 2020)

References

External links
 

Year of birth missing (living people)
Living people
British film editors
Best Film Editing Academy Award winners
Place of birth missing (living people)